Delia Boccardo (born 29 January 1948) is an Italian film, television and stage actress.

Life and career 
Born in Genoa, Boccardo spent her childhood and adolescence in Nervi, then studied at a Swiss college, at the Poggio Imperiale girls' school and, for about three years, at a college in Sussex, England. In 1965 she moved to Rome where she attended the Centro Sperimentale di Cinematografia. 

Boccardo made her film debut in 1966, in the Spaghetti Western Death Walks in Laredo; she made her stage debut in 1967, alongside Raf Vallone in Uno sguardo dal ponte. From the mid-1980s she focused her appearances on stage, where she worked intensively with Luca Ronconi,  and on television.

Partial filmography 
 
 Death Walks in Laredo (1966) - Mady
 The Wild Eye (1967) - Barbara Bates
 Inspector Clouseau (1968) - Lisa Morrel
 Snow Job (1969) - Lorraine Borman
 Detective Belli (1969) - Sandy Bronson
 The Adventurers (1970) - Caroline de Coyne
 Una macchia rosa (1970) - Livia
 The Cannibals (1970) - Ismene
 Strogoff (1970) - Sangarre
 Between Miracles (1971) - Giovanna Visciani
 Equinozio (1971) - Anna / Una ragazza in riva al mare
 Stress (1971)
 Snow Job (1972) - Lorraine Borman
 Panhandle 38 (1972) - Connie Briscott
 High Crime (1973) - Mirella
 Massacre in Rome (1973) - Elena
 Shoot First, Die Later (1974) - Sandra
 A Black Ribbon for Deborah (1974) - Mira Wener
 La mazurka del barone, della santa e del fico fiorone (1975) - Redheaded prostitute / The 'saint'
 The Last Day of School Before Christmas (1975) - Germana
 Silent Action (1975) - Maria
 Il caso Raoul (1975) - Delia
 Giovannino (1976)
 A Woman at Her Window (1976) - Dora Cooper
 Tentacles (1977) - Vicky Gleason
 Improvviso (1979) - La Tedesca
 Martin Eden (1979 TV mini-series) (1979) - Ruth Morse
 The Day Christ Died (1980, TV Movie) - Mary Magdelene
 Roma dalla finestra (1982) - Olga
 Aphrodite (1982) - Barbara
 Nostalghia (1983) - Domenico's Wife
 Hercules (1983) - Athena
 The Assisi Underground (1985) - Countess Cristina
 Blood Ties (1986, TV Movie) - Sara Salina
 The Secret of the Sahara (1987, TV Mini-Series) - Yasmine
 Sposi (1988) - Assunta
 Cavalli si nasce (1989) - La Baronessa
 L'isola alla deriva (1989) - Madamoiselle
 The Week of the Sphinx (1990) - Sara
 Il nodo alla cravatta (1991)
 The Return of Casanova (1992) - Amelie
 Dichiarazioni d'amore (1994) - Adult Sandra
 Fade out (Dissolvenza al nero) (1994)
 Questo è il giardino (1999) - Carlo's mother
 Empty Eyes (2001) - Marco's Mother
 Virginia, la monaca di Monza (2004, TV Movie) - Virginia's mother

References

External links 

 

Italian film actresses
1948 births
Actors from Genoa
Italian television actresses
Living people
Italian stage actresses
Centro Sperimentale di Cinematografia alumni
20th-century Italian actresses
People from Nervi